American Siren is a beauty contest started November 2010.  It is an urban pageant offering a yearly cash prize, entertainment contracts, and scholarship assistance to the winners. The pageant's focus is to spotlight the modern urban woman and to promote women in business.

History
American Siren was launched by Invision Filmworks in January 2011 as a recruiting tool for new faces in the entertainment industry, keeping inline with the principles of presenting more positive images of minorities and urban life.  The pageant was created as a solution to the exploitation and controversy of hip hop models and so called video vixens; providing positive representations of the morals and values of minority and urban women instead of the more common negative, degrading, subservient, or misogynistic images popularly portrayed.  The pageant's intention is to showcase the "urban woman" in a new light by combining the world of entertainment with the world of business thus giving young women not just positive new role models but educating them of the many career options available despite the preconceived prejudices toward beauty.

References

External links
https://twitter.com/americansiren
https://www.facebook.com/pages/American-Siren/181092145249361

2010 establishments in the United States
American awards
Beauty pageants in the United States
Recurring events established in 2010
Scholarships in the United States